Bellikkal is a village to the south of the Sigur Plateau in Tamil Nadu. Bellikkal is located about 245 km from Bangalore and 15 km from Ootacamund.

References

Villages in Nilgiris district